Ha Che is a village in Pat Heung, Yuen Long District, Hong Kong.

Administration
Ha Che is a recognized village under the New Territories Small House Policy.

History
At the time of the 1911 census, the population of Ha Che was 234. The number of males was 109.

References

External links
 Delineation of area of existing village Ha Che Tsuen (Pat Heung) for election of resident representative (2019 to 2022)

Villages in Yuen Long District, Hong Kong
Pat Heung